Enter by the Twelfth Gate is the first solo album by Symphony X keyboardist, Michael Pinnella.

Track listing

References

2004 debut albums
Inside Out Music albums